The 13th Asian Roller Hockey Championship, was held in Dalian, China, between 9 and 15 January 2010. The place of the matches was the Dalian Nationalities University. This Tournament is organized by the Confederation of Asia Roller Sports (CARS) and is the Rink Hockey Asian Championship.

Men Championship
The Men's National teams participating were Macau, Japan, Taiwan and India.

Macau's Team was composed by the following players: 
Keepers: Leong Chak In and Paulo Gibelino.
Field Players: Nuno Antunes, Hélder Ricardo, Augusto Ramos, Ricardo Atraca, Alexandre Torrão, Dinísio da Luz, Alfredo Almeida and Alberto Lisboa
Trainer: Alberto Lisboa

Results

12-01-2010 Macau 6-2 Taiwan
Macau Goals by: Nuno Antunes (3), Alberto Lisboa, Augusto Fernandes e Ricardo Atraca
12-01-2010 Japan  4-3  India
13-01-2010 Macau  12-7  India
Macau Goals by: Hélder Ricardo (4), Alberto Lisboa (3), Augusto Fernandes (3) e Nuno Antunes (2)
13-01-2010 Japan  4-1  Taiwan
14-01-2010 India  5-2  Taiwan
14-01-2010 Macau  2-2  Japan
Macau Goals by: Hélder Ricardo e Ricardo Atraca

Ladies Championship

The Women's National teams participating are Macau, Japan, Taiwan and India.

Macau's Team was composed by the following players:
Keepers: Michelle Ritchie and Palmira Pena.
Field Players: Sara Barrias, Dulce Atraca, Shelley Calangi, Cíntia Leite, A Weng and Kok Ka Man.
Trainer: Alberto Lisboa.

Results

11-01-2010 Taiwan - India
11-01-2010 Japan  5-0 Macau
12-01-2010 India 12-1 Macau
Macau Goals by: Dulce Atraca Lisboa 
12-01-2010 Japan  -  Taiwan
13-01-2010 India  -  Japan
13-01-2010 Macau  1-13  Taiwan
Macau Goals by: Sara Barrias

External links
 13th Asian Roller hockey Championship in Dalian

 FIRS Organizational chart
CIRH website
 India Federation of Roller Sports
 Hong Kong Federation of Roller Sports
 South Korean Federation of Roller Sports
 Japan Roller Sports Federation
 Hóquei Macau
 Roller Hockey links worldwide
 Mundook-World Roller Hockey
Hardballhock-World Roller Hockey
Inforoller World Roller Hockey 
 World Roller Hockey Blog
rink-hockey-news - World Roller Hockey
SoloHockey World Roller Hockey
Rink Hockey in the USA
USARS Hardballhockey Blog

Asian Championship
Roller hockey competitions
Asian Roller Hockey Championship, 2010
Roller hockey in Asia
International roller hockey competitions hosted by China